Apteligent (previously known as Crittercism Inc.), based in San Francisco, California, is a mobile application providing both tools and app performance insights for mobile developers and product managers and mobile ecosystem performance data. The Apteligent platform provides a real-time global view of app diagnostics and failures across iOS, Android, Hybrid, and Unity apps and is used in more than 9 billion monthly app launches by 23 million apps including Pokémon Go.

Mobile Ecosystem Data Reports 
In 2016, Apteligent launched a directory for Android and iOS devices by geography, as well as monthly reports focused on various aspects of iOS and Android version adoption, performance, and stability. In addition, in April 2016, Apteligent partnered with STL Partners, a London-based telecommunications industry analyst firm, to deliver a quarterly report focused on global network carrier performance and its potential impact on user experience.

Acquisition 
On May 15, 2017, VMware announced its acquisition of Apteligent. The product remains available, and VMware recently announced an additional product, Workspace ONE Intelligence, that builds on the acquisition.

References

Further reading

External links 

Software companies based in the San Francisco Bay Area
Companies based in San Francisco
2010 establishments in California
Mobile technology companies
Defunct software companies of the United States